Dougald Lamont  (born April 23, 1969) is a Canadian politician and leader of the Manitoba Liberal Party. He is a member of the Legislative Assembly of Manitoba, representing the constituency of St. Boniface since a by-election held on July 17, 2018.

Early life 
Lamont holds Bachelor of Arts and Master of Arts degrees in English literature from the University of Manitoba. He was a vice-president of the Graduate Students' Association and a member of the University of Manitoba Board of Governors. Lamont worked as an instructor in government–business relations at the University of Winnipeg.

Political career 
He ran for a seat in the Manitoba legislature in the 2003 provincial election, placing second in St. Boniface behind then-finance minister and future New Democratic Party of Manitoba leader and Premier Greg Selinger.

In 2013, Lamont was the runner-up in the Manitoba Liberal Party leadership election to Rana Bokhari.

Lamont has worked as an advisor to Jon Gerrard, Sharon Carstairs, MaryAnn Mihychuk, Robert-Falcon Ouellette, and Winnipeg City Council member John Orlikow. He served as co-chair of Ouellette's campaign to become Mayor of Winnipeg in 2014, and was director of communications for Ouellette's successful campaign to become Member of Parliament for Winnipeg Centre in 2015.

Lamont was elected Manitoba Liberal leader at the October 21, 2017 Liberal leadership election, defeating MLA Cindy Lamoureux on the second ballot by eight votes. On July 17, 2018, he was elected to the Legislative Assembly of Manitoba for St. Boniface in a by-election held after Greg Selinger resigned as the riding's MLA when he retired from politics.

Lamont led the Manitoba Liberals into the 2019 provincial election. He was one of three Liberal MLAs returned, being re-elected in St. Boniface, while Gerrard was re-elected in River Heights and Lamoureux won in Tyndall Park.

Electoral record

References

External links
 

1969 births
Living people
Businesspeople from Winnipeg
Manitoba political party leaders
Manitoba Liberal Party MLAs
Politicians from Winnipeg